Chelepteryx is a genus of moths of the family Anthelidae first described by George Robert Gray in 1835.

Species
 Chelepteryx chalepteryx Felder, 1874
 Chelepteryx collesi Gray, 1835

References

Anthelidae
Taxa named by George Robert Gray